Jana Šedová (born 16 January 1974) is a Slovak snowboarder. She competed at the 1998 Winter Olympics and the 2002 Winter Olympics.

References

1974 births
Living people
Slovak female snowboarders
Olympic snowboarders of Slovakia
Snowboarders at the 1998 Winter Olympics
Snowboarders at the 2002 Winter Olympics
Sportspeople from Bratislava